Mary Barton is a British historical television series which originally aired on BBC 2 in 1964. It is based on the 1848 novel of the same title by Elizabeth Gaskell.

Cast
 Lois Daine as  Mary Barton
 George A. Cooper as John Barton
 Cyril Luckham as  Mr. Carson
 Linda Marlowe as  Sophy Carson
 Barry Warren as Jem Wilson
 Gwendolyn Watts as Margaret Legh
 Joe Gladwin as Job Legh
 Clare Kelly as Jane Wilson
 Elsie Wagstaff as Aunt Alice
 Peter Ashcroft as Charley Jones
 Reg Lever as  Parker
 Eileen Dale as Mrs. Carson
 Kenneth Laird as  Sgt. Wilkinson
 Brian Peck as  Will
 Bernard Severn as  Seaton
 Patrick Mower as Harry Carson
 Jean Alexander as  Mrs. Jones
 Jack Allen as  Duncombe 
 Michael Bird as  Gardener 
 Frank Crawshaw as Bridgenorth
 John Dawson as Superintendent
 Fred Ferris as Hargreaves
 Jack Lester as Hume
 John Barrett as George Wilson
 George Betton as  Boatman
 John Bosch as Young Boy
 Ogilvie Crombie as Judge
 Donald Eccles as Clinton
 Maxwell Foster as Lord John Russell
 Patrick Godfrey as Williams
 Martin Heller as Court Usher
 Alan Lake as Knobstick
 Howard Lockhart as Clerk of the Court
 Jean Marlow as Parlourmaid
 John McKelvey as Doctor
 Douglas Murchie as  Captain
 Graham Rigby as Duerden
 William Sherwood as  Daniel O'Connell
 Jane Tann as Mrs. Davenport

References

Bibliography
Baskin, Ellen . Serials on British Television, 1950-1994. Scolar Press, 1996.

External links
 

BBC television dramas
1964 British television series debuts
1964 British television series endings
English-language television shows
Television shows based on British novels